Heartbeat is a studio album by Curtis Mayfield.

Background
This 1979 offering mixed disco rhythms with soul balladeering. It's the first Mayfield album he didn't produce entirely. Future Temptation Ron Tyson contributed to some of the songwriting and production. Norman Harris and Ronald Tyson also produced two songs, while Bunny Sigler produced three, and Mayfield himself produced three. He wrote and produced an additional song, "Tomorrow Night for Sure",  that surfaced in 1990 on the collection Of All Time / Classic Collection. Not on the original LP, "Tomorrow Night for Sure" is also available on the Japanese re-issue of Heartbeat as an additional track (1998) and on an expanded British CD re-issue of The Right Combination (1999). "Tell Me, Tell Me (How Ya Like to be Loved)" was remixed for a 12" by Fred Breitberg and Michael Hearn and the duet with Linda Clifford "Between You Baby and Me", edited as a single, was also issued on The Right Combination, an album of duets between both singers released in 1980. 

The cover photography was by Norman Seeff.

Track listing

References

1979 albums
Curtis Mayfield albums
Albums produced by Norman Harris
Albums produced by Curtis Mayfield
Curtom Records albums